Santiago Apóstol is a town and municipality in Oaxaca, southwestern Mexico. It is part of the Ocotlán District south of the Valles Centrales Region

References

Municipalities of Oaxaca